Modern Pentathlon Australia (MPA) is the governing body for the sport of modern pentathlon in Australia.

References

External links
 

Australia
Modern pentathlon in Australia
Sports governing bodies in Australia